Nant Gelliwion Woodland is a Site of Special Scientific Interest in Glamorgan, south Wales.

See also
List of Sites of Special Scientific Interest in Mid & South Glamorgan

Sites of Special Scientific Interest in Mid & South Glamorgan